Between Evening and Morning is a 1923 German silent film directed by Arthur Robison and starring Werner Krauss, Agnes Straub, and Elga Brink.

Cast

Bibliography

External links

1923 films
Films of the Weimar Republic
German silent feature films
Films directed by Arthur Robison
German black-and-white films